The Treacherous Three is the first studio album by American hip hop group Treacherous Three. It was released in 1984 via Sugar Hill Records with distribution of MCA Records and produced by Sylvia Robinson. Complex (magazine) puts the album at number 37 on their 50 Greatest Rap Albums 1980s.

The songs "At the Party", "Feel the Heartbeat" and "The Body Rock" were recorded and released from 1980 to 1981 as 12" singles for Bobby Robinson's Enjoy Records and were also compiled on Whip It (1983). The songs "Turning You On", "U.F.O." and "Get Up" were recorded and released in 1983 on Sylvia Robinson's Sugar Hill Records.

The group's sophomore album, Old School Flava, was released a decade later.

Track listing

Notes
"Feel the Heartbeat" sampled "Heartbeat" by Taana Gardner
"At the Party" sampled "Daisy Lady" by 7th Wonder

Personnel
Kevin Keaton – vocals
Lamar A. Hill – vocals
Mohandes Dewese – vocals
Sylvia Robinson – producer
Paul Austin – mastering
Carl Rowatti – mastering
Hemu Aggarwal – photography

Legacy 
 "The Body Rock" was sampled on "Honey" by Mariah Carey (1997) and "Drop It on Me" by Ricky Martin (2005)
 "At the Party" was sampled on "Moe Love on the 1 and 2" by Ultramagnetic MCs (1992) 
 "Feel the Heartbeat" was sampled by various recording artists and deejays, such as KRS-One ("Heartbeat", 1997), Troy Ave ("Good Time", 2014), and was later remixed by Clark Kent on the Treacherous Three track "Feel the New Heartbeat" from their 1994 album Old School Flava.

References

External links

1984 debut albums
Treacherous Three albums
Sugar Hill Records (hip hop label) albums
MCA Records albums